Miriam Del Banco (June 27, 1858 – November 6, 1931) was a Jewish-American poet and educator.

Biography
Miriam Del Banco was born in New Orleans, Louisiana, to German-Jewish parents Johanna and Rabbi Max del Banco. Her father died shortly after her birth, and the family moved to St. Louis. Later she was sent to her uncle Louis Meyer at Cape Girardeau, Missouri, where she attended the State Normal School.

After completing the course with honors, she rejoined her mother, who in the meantime had relocated to Chicago, in which city Del Banco obtained in 1885 a position as teacher in the public schools. In 1889 she became assistant principal at the Von Humboldt School. In 1904, she became principal of the McClellan Elementary School, and four years later, principal of the Motley Public School. She would go on to receive a Ph.D. from DePaul University in 1921.

Del Banco was a frequent contributor to the Jewish and general press, having written a large number of poems, both Jewish and secular. Most of her prose publications appeared in educational journals. She likewise translated Meyer Kayserling's Die jüdischen Frauen in der Geschichte, Literatur und Kunst, which appeared as a serial in the columns of the Jewish Advance and was published in Chicago in 1881; and 's Ludwig Börne, which appeared in the Menorah, 1888–89. She recited her poem "White Day of Peace" at the 1893 Jewish Women's Congress, receiving a standing ovation.

A collection of Del Banco's poetry was published after her death under the title Poetry and Prose.

Selected publications

Notes

References

External links
 Poems by Del Banco at PoetryExplorer

1867 births
1931 deaths
19th-century American women writers
20th-century American Jews
20th-century American women writers
American school principals
American women poets
DePaul University alumni
German–English translators
Jewish American poets
Jewish educators
Jewish women writers
Missouri State University alumni
Women school principals and headteachers